Bulacan's 3rd congressional district is one of the seven congressional districts in the province of Bulacan, Philippines. It has been represented in the House of Representatives since 1987. The district consists of municipalities in northern and eastern Bulacan, namely Doña Remedios Trinidad, San Ildefonso, San Miguel, and San Rafael. It is currently represented in the 19th Congress by Lorna Silverio of the National Unity Party (NUP).

Representation history

Election results

2022

2019

2016

2013

2010

See also
Legislative districts of Bulacan

References

Congressional districts of the Philippines
Politics of Bulacan
1987 establishments in the Philippines
Congressional districts of Central Luzon
Constituencies established in 1987